Jozef Murgaš (English Joseph Murgas) (17 February 1864 – 11 May 1929) was a Slovak inventor, architect, botanist, painter and Roman Catholic priest. He contributed to wireless telegraphy and helped in the development of mobile communications and the wireless transmission of information and the human voice.

Murgaš was nicknamed the Radio Priest and deemed a Renaissance man.

Life

Europe
Murgaš was born in Tajov (Tajó), Kingdom of Hungary, Austrian Empire (now Slovakia). He studied theology in Prešporok (Pressburg, present Bratislava) (1880–82), Esztergom (Ostrihom) (1882–84) and in Banská Bystrica, where he graduated in 1888. From his youth he was bright, skillful and good at painting and electrotechnology. The vice-head of the school in Esztergom allowed him to use the physics room for experiments and the Slovak painters B. Klemens and Dominik Skutecký noticed his talent for painting.

After priestly ordination in 1888, Murgaš worked as a curate. On Skutecký's initiative, Murgaš was accepted at a painting school in Budapest, where he studied from 1889–90. He also studied painting in Munich from 1890–93. He attended both schools while working. He painted sacral pieces, Slovak landscapes and Slovak personalities. It was due to his strong patriotism he exhibited during holidays in the 1890s that he was not allowed to finish his painting studies and had to work as a curate in changing places in the Kingdom of Hungary: in Chrenovec (Nyitratormás), Slovenská Ľupča (Zólyomlipcse), Dubová (Cseres) and in Lopej (Lopér). In Lopej, he painted a large sacral picture of St. George which is still on the church altar of the village. The central altar painting of St. Elisabeth in the 14th century Church of St. Elizabeth in the main square of Banská Bystrica was by Murgaš.

United States
Due to permanent conflicts with the bishop's secretary, Murgaš had to emigrate to the United States in 1896, where he was assigned a Slovak parish in the city of Wilkes-Barre, Pennsylvania. Having no possibility for painting, he started to deal with natural sciences again, especially electrotechnology. He established a laboratory in Wilkes-Barre, in which he primarily investigated radiotelegraphy. His article in the Tovaryšstvo magazine of 1900 shows that his radiotelegraphy studies had achieved a high level. In 1904, he received his first two US patents: the Apparatus for wireless telegraphy and The way of transmitted messages by wireless telegraphy. Further 15 patents followed between 1907 and 1916 (see below). Based on the first two patents, he created the Universal Aether Telegraph Co., which organized a public test of Murgaš's transmitting and receiving facilities in September 1905 (see below). The test was successful, but a storm destroyed the antenna masts three month later, which led to a dissolution of the company.

Murgaš's primary concern in Wilkes-Barre, however, were the local Slovaks. He took care of Slovak immigrants, had a new church, library, cemetery, several schools, gymnasium and playgrounds built, all of which are still used by American Slovaks. He was also one of the founders of the Saints Cyril and Methodius community and took care of children and youth. He was very popular among religious people because of his emotional relation to them. He also published a newspaper, in which he published some popular science articles and verses.

Murgaš was active in the Slovak expatriates movement, wrote articles for their press, was one of the founders of the Slovak League in America, actively supported the creation of the state of Czechoslovakia, organized a money collection (a fund) of American Slovaks for the creation of Czechoslovakia (US$1,000,000) and was also a writer and a signatory of the Pittsburgh Agreement (1918) between Czechs and Slovaks on establishing Czechoslovakia. As a respected personality, he gained the trust and support of the highest authorities in the US for the establishment of Czechoslovakia.

Murgaš continued to study physics and to do many experiments. He financed his activities by selling his paintings. He also collected mushrooms, plants, minerals and insects. His butterfly collection comprised 9000 pieces from all over the world.

When the United States entered World War I, private radiotelegraphy stations were prohibited which put an end to Murgaš's pioneer work in this field. After the creation of Czechoslovakia, he returned to Slovakia in 1920, where he taught electrotechnology at a high school but since he did not find appropriate understanding by the Ministry of Education in Prague, he returned to Wilkes-Barre four months later. He was nominated to be a member of the Federal Radio Commission of the United States in 1925. Murgaš died in Wilkes-Barre four years later.

Importance and primacy conflicts

The most dynamic segments in the area of communication services today are internet services, mobile telephony and convergence of voice and data process. If we go back one hundred years to history we can see that development in this area began with wireless information transmission encoded in telegraphy marks and wireless voice transmission which was made by frequency modulation.

In 1905, Murgaš achieved radio transmission between Wilkes-Barre and Scranton, Pennsylvania, or a distance of 20 miles (30 km).

The tone system is the use of two signals of different frequencies, i.e. Murgaš substituted the "dot" of the Morse code with a higher tone and the "dash" with a lower tone (this is the 1904 patent "The way of transmitted messages by wireless telegraphy").

Thomas Edison paid remarkable attention to Murgaš's experiments and he is said to have informed Guglielmo Marconi of Murgaš's success. Murgaš's lab in Wilkes-Barre was visited by President Theodore Roosevelt in 1905.

Patents 1904 - 1916
   "Wireless-telegraph apparatus" (1904)
  	"The way of transmitted messages by wireless telegraphy" (1904)
  "Constructing Antennas for Wireless Telegraphy" (July 16, 1907).
  	"Wave meter" (1907)
  	"Electrical transformer" [1907)
  	"Underground wireless telegraphy"
  	"Apparatus for making electromagnetic waves" (1908)
  	"Wireless telegraphy"(1909)
  	"Making of sparkles frequency from power supply without interrupter"(1909)
  	"Magnetic waves detector"(1909)
  	"Magnetic detector" (1909)
  "Apparatus for making electrical oscillations" (1911)
  "Spinning reel for fishing rod" (1912)
  Improved invention in the United States; given in England GB9726 in 1907
  "The way and apparatus for making electrical alternating current oscillations" (1916)
 Co-author of 2 inventions concerned with electrical arc lamps (1910)

Memorials and honors
In Tajov, there is Murgaš's house where he was born, a memorial room and a symbolic grave with a sepulchral monument of Murgaš at the local cemetery. Jozef Šebo, the founder of the room and monument (now a retired teacher) looks after them very carefully. The memorial room also features originals of pictures, paintings, some unique pieces from his  butterfly collection, models of inventions in wireless telegraphy and documents. One can also see there a minimodel of Murgaš's original antenna masts built by company Universal Aether Telegraph Co. in Wilkes-Barre in 1905.

Further objects include: 
 Rev. Jozef Murgaš Room at King's College (Pennsylvania)
Jozef Murgaš Monument in Bratislava, Slovakia – the Slovak Telecom building in the Jarošova Street
Jozef Murgaš street in Podbrezová-Lopej, Slovakia
Joseph Murgas Monument in Wilkes-Barre, Pennsylvania
Paintings in a church in Wilkes-Barre in Pennsylvania
Paintings in the Memorial room in Tajov, in some churches in Lopej and Banská Bystrica
Murgas Amateur Radio Club of Wilkes-Barre, PA named after Fr. Murgas in 1975.
Model of Murgas' transmitting station in Wilkes-Barre
Collection of butterflies (9,000 pieces) from all over the world
Liberty ship SS Joseph Murgas in the U.S. state Georgia in 1944
Jozef Murgaš Secondary School of Electrical Engineering in Banská Bystrica, Slovakia
Jozef Murgaš stamp issued by the Ministry of Transport, Communications and Public Works of the Slovak Republic in 1994 (400,000 pieces) on the occasion of the 130th birth anniversary (1864) of Jozef Murgaš.
To the memory of Murgaš and to support the development of telecommunications in Slovakia, the Jozef Murgaš Award is awarded annually by the Slovak Electrotechnical Society and Ministry of Transport, Posts and Telecommunications of the Slovak Republic for:
publication of original theoretical contribution supporting development of telecommunication in Slovakia and
utilization of original or foreign theoretical contribution to development of telecommunications and telecommunication industry in Slovakia.

See also
List of Roman Catholic scientist-clerics

References

External links
Jozef Murgas - The Forgotten Radio Genius
Slovak Academy of Sciences - Mathematical Institute - Jozef Murgas - The source for this article. (Slovak)
The  Murgas  System  of  Wireless  Telegraphy, Electrical World and Engineer, July 15, 1905, pages 100–101.
The  Murgas  System  of  Wireless  Telegraphy by Josef Murgas, Electrical Review'', December 2, 1905, pages 849–852.
Communication Technology Forum's article on Murgaš
Murgas Amateur Radio Club, Wilkes-Barre, PA
Jozef Murgaš at Monoskop.org

1864 births
1929 deaths
People from Banská Bystrica District
Slovak Roman Catholic priests
Austro-Hungarian emigrants to the United States
Hungarian emigrants to the United States
People from the Kingdom of Hungary
American people of Slovak descent
People from Wilkes-Barre, Pennsylvania
Radio pioneers
Catholic clergy scientists
Slovak inventors
Slovak scientists